Hubertus Bigend is a fictional character appearing in the third trilogy of novels of science fiction and literary author William Gibson. Bigend is the antihero of Gibson's Pattern Recognition (2003), Spook Country (2007) and Zero History (2010). In an interview Gibson says "I've always had a sense of Bigend as someone who presents himself as though he knows what's going on, but who in fact doesn't. It's just my sense of the subtext of the character: he's bullshitting himself, at the same time as he's bullshitting all of us."

Character history

Pattern Recognition

Bigend is introduced in Pattern Recognition as the charismatic founder of the fictional "viral advertising"/coolhunting agency Blue Ant, from the perspective of protagonist Cayce Pollard:

Bigend hires Pollard to track down the source of haunting film fragments known as "the footage" that have been appearing anonymously online, though she loathes him and suspects that his motivation is mercenary; the exploitation of the art as a marketable commodity. Bigend and Blue Ant benefit from Pollard's work both by the discovery of the origin of the footage and by a relationship he establishes with a Russian oligarch. In Spook Country, it is revealed that Bigend successfully harnesses the footage to sell shoes.

Spook Country
Gibson did not anticipate Bigend appearing in Spook Country, but realised when writing about a non-existent magazine named Node—characterized as a European version of Wired—that it was "way Bigendian". Thus, Bigend appears as the backer of the ethereal magazine. Again seeking out the origin of a new artwork (in this instance locative), Bigend hires protagonist Hollis Henry for the ostensible purpose of writing a magazine article on it. Of Bigend, Henry is told that "he doesn't want you to have heard of him". To sate her curiosity, Henry accesses his fictional Wikipedia entry:

The book also reveals that the correct pronunciation of "Bigend" is "bay-jhan", though this is seldom used even by Bigend himself.

Zero History
Bigend again featured prominently in Zero History, Gibson's 2010 follow-up to Spook Country, again as the employer of Hollis Henry. In it, he wears a suit in the color International Klein Blue which he likes because it is a color that cannot be represented on most computer monitors.

Critical impression 
Bigend is described by Times Union reviewer Michael Janairo as a "hyper-connected, ever curious, multigazillionaire", and by biopunk writer Paul Di Filippo as amoral and egocentric. Other appellations include "imperious" (SFGate), "enigmatic" (St. Louis Post-Dispatch), "pontifical Belgian ad mogul" (The Village Voice), "filthy-rich man-behind-the-curtain" (Seattle Times), "untrustworthy corporate spiv" (The Guardian), "accentless Machiavellian fixer with unnervingly white teeth" (New Statesman), and "information-sucking android-like advertising guru and godgame magus" (John Clute, Sci Fi Weekly).

Academic Alex Wetmore identified a parallel between the relationships of Bigend and Cayce Pollard and that of Case, the protagonist of Gibson's Neuromancer (1984) and the entity which recruits him, characterizing both Bigend and Case's recruiter as "mysterious and potentially untrustworthy". Wetmore observes that Bigend "espouses a curiously communal and transnational approach to marketing" compared to that of the money-hungry dot-commers whose frontier individualism the corporate universe has rejected in favour of the Bigendian approach. The character of Bigend thus represents for Wetmore "a shift in the nature of capitalism and, consequently, a change in the way postindustrial technologies deployed by capitalism interact with the self."

Footnotes
 Spook Countrys Node was the inspiration for the real-life literary project Node Magazine.

Related pages 
 List of fictional anti-heroes
 Endianness

Citations

References 

Characters in novels of the 21st century
Characters in written science fiction
William Gibson characters
Fictional businesspeople
Fictional advertising executives
Fictional mass media owners
Literary characters introduced in 2003